Shahrdari Ashkhaneh Football Club is an Iranian football club based in Ashkhaneh, Khorasan Shomali, Iran. They competed in the 2010–11 Hazfi Cup.

Season-by-Season

The table below shows the achievements of the club in various competitions.

See also
 Hazfi Cup 2010–11

Football clubs in Iran
Association football clubs established in 2003
2003 establishments in Iran